Live from the Time Coast is a double live CD by Spirit with 28 tracks.  It is the fourth album to be released from the archives of the late Randy California.  Recorded between 1989 and 1996, with a line-up that features founding members Randy California and drummer Ed Cassidy with Mike Nile on bass. This incarnation of Spirit is referred to by Spirit's hard-core followers as "The Tent Of Miracles Band".

Never released in any form previously and recorded in a number of venues from Manchester to Colorado and from London to Utah.

Track listing 
All songs written by Randy California except noted.

Personnel

Spirit 
Randy California - Guitar, Harmonica, Vocals
Ed Cassidy - Percussion, Drums
Mike Nile - Bass, Vocals
Scott Monahan - Keyboards, Vocals
George Valuck - Keyboards

Production  
Mick Skidmore - Producer, Mastering
Pete Tytler - Artwork

References 

Spirit (band) albums
2004 live albums